José Martins (born 5 August 1931) is a Brazilian boxer. He competed in the men's flyweight event at the 1960 Summer Olympics. At the 1960 Summer Olympics in Rome, he lost to Mircea Dobrescu of Romania in the Round of 32.

References

External links
 

1931 births
Possibly living people
Brazilian male boxers
Olympic boxers of Brazil
Boxers at the 1960 Summer Olympics
Boxers at the 1959 Pan American Games
Pan American Games silver medalists for Brazil
Pan American Games medalists in boxing
Sportspeople from São Paulo
Flyweight boxers
Medalists at the 1959 Pan American Games
20th-century Brazilian people